James W. Draper (1925 – 23 February 2006) was the Scottish Amateur golf champion in 1954. He won the tournament 4 & 3 at Nairn Golf Club.

Thirty three years later, Colin Montgomerie won the Scottish Amateur title on the same course. Both golfers attended Strathallan School in Perthshire, Scotland.

See also
List of male golfers

References

Scottish male golfers
Amateur golfers
People educated at Strathallan School
1925 births
2006 deaths